Blue River station is on the Canadian National Railway mainline in Blue River, British Columbia.  The station is served by Via Rail's The Canadian. Blue River Via Rail Station is a flag stop (48 hours advance notice required).

Station staff formerly tended a railway garden. It grew a wide variety of plants, including butternut, northern red oak, bur oak, sugar maple and common horse chestnut. By 1994 it had been razed.

Footnotes

External links 
Via Rail Station Description

Via Rail stations in British Columbia